Donald "Don" J. C. Skene (born 1936, Cardiff), is a Welsh former racing cyclist. He represented Wales at the British Empire and Commonwealth Games on several occasions, the first time in 1954 in the 10 km scratch race, the kilo and the road race (100 km); again in 1958 in the 10 km scratch race, the kilo and the sprint; and for the final time in 1962 competing once again in the 10 km scratch race, the kilo and the sprint. He was the bronze medalist in the scratch race in both 1954 and 1958. He rode many international races representing the R.A.F. and British national teams, in South Africa, Guiana in South America and on the continent.

Skene began racing at the age of 15, joining the Tigers Cycling Club, and at 16 in 1952, he opened a small bicycle shop on Rumney Hill, Newport Road, Cardiff. He ran the business for 53 years before passing on control of the business to his daughter Liane and son Jon in 2005. The shop also sponsors the Team Skene cycling team. Don has since retired and now lives in Florida, in the United States.

Palmarès

References

External links
 Don Skene Cycles

1936 births
Living people
Welsh male cyclists
Commonwealth Games bronze medallists for Wales
Cyclists at the 1954 British Empire and Commonwealth Games
Cyclists at the 1958 British Empire and Commonwealth Games
Cyclists at the 1962 British Empire and Commonwealth Games
Sportspeople from Cardiff
Commonwealth Games medallists in cycling
Medallists at the 1954 British Empire and Commonwealth Games
Medallists at the 1958 British Empire and Commonwealth Games